Thomas Henry Braden (September 11, 1874 – after 1941) served as the fiftieth Mayor of Lowell, Massachusetts.

Born in Mooers, New York, Braden worked as a clerk in the city's office of elections, eventually becoming the Commissioner of Elections. He was elected to a one-year term as mayor of Lowell in 1928, and re-elected to a two-year term in 1929. In 1932, Braden sought the Republican nomination for sheriff of Middlesex County, Massachusetts. and in 1936, was elected to the Massachusetts State Senate from that county, defeating Democratic challenger James H. Deignan to succeed the retiring incumbent Democratic senator William F. McCarty. In the state senate, Braden championed efforts to limit or prohibit Sunday liquor sales. Braden ran for mayor again in 1939, but was defeated by Democrat George D. Ashe. Braden ran for mayor for a last time in 1941, and was again defeated by Ashe, thereafter declaring his retirement from politics.

Braden was married in the late 1910s, but his wife died of influenza in 1918, three months after their marriage. He married his second wife, Florence J. Hunter of Lowell, in 1931.

See also
 1937–1938 Massachusetts legislature

References

1874 births
Mayors of Lowell, Massachusetts
Republican Party Massachusetts state senators
Lowell, Massachusetts City Council members
Year of death missing
People from Mooers, New York